Francesco Uliano (born 19 September 1989) is an Italian footballer who plays as a midfielder for  club Gelbison.

External links
 

1989 births
Footballers from Naples
Living people
Italian footballers
Association football midfielders
S.S.D. Città di Gela players
A.C. Mezzocorona players
U.S. Pergolettese 1932 players
Ascoli Calcio 1898 F.C. players
F.C. Südtirol players
U.S. Grosseto 1912 players
U.S. Catanzaro 1929 players
Mantova 1911 players
Pordenone Calcio players
A.C. Monza players
U.S. 1913 Seregno Calcio players
Cavese 1919 players
Serie B players
Serie C players
Serie D players